Oroshori may refer to:

 Oroshoris, an ethnic group native to the Pamir Mountains
 Oroshori language, a Pamiri language spoken by the ethnic group